Numbers of Sri Lankan internally displaced persons displaced from the Vanni region since October 2008 and detained by the Sri Lankan Military at various camps in northern Sri Lanka during February 2010 to December 2010:

References

Refugee camps in Sri Lanka
IDP 2010
IDP